Iron Man, also known as Iron Man: The Animated Series, is an American animated television series based on Marvel Comics' superhero Iron Man. The series aired from 1994 to 1996 in syndication as part of The Marvel Action Hour, which packaged Iron Man with another animated series based on Marvel properties, the Fantastic Four, with one half-hour episode from each series airing back-to-back. The show was backed by a toy line that featured many armor variants.

This series of Iron Man was among the few television series to be re-recorded in THX. This may have been usual at the time for a motion picture, but it is rare for a television series. Off the heels of the release of the live-action Iron Man film in 2008, reruns began airing on the Jetix block on Toon Disney.

Series overview

Although only lasting two seasons, Iron Man was the subject of a major overhaul between seasons when its production studio was changed. The result was a massively changed premise, tone, and general approach, which left the disparate seasons scarcely recognizable as being two halves of the same series.

First season
The first season of Iron Man featured little more than a Masters of the Universe-style battle of "good against evil", as billionaire industrialist Tony Stark battled the evil forces of the world-conquering Mandarin as the armored superhero, Iron Man. In his evil endeavors to steal Stark's technology and Iron Man's armor, the Mandarin led a group of villains consisting of Dreadknight, Blizzard, Blacklash, Grey Gargoyle (when it comes to fighting Iron Man and his team, he has a tendency to accidentally turn his fellow villains to stone), Hypnotia (an exclusive villain whom Dreadknight and Blacklash were rivals for the affections of), Whirlwind, Living Laser, MODOK, Fin Fang Foom, and Justin Hammer. To combat these villains, Iron Man had the help of his own team (based on Force Works, a then-current comic book team which has since faded into obscurity), including Century, War Machine, Scarlet Witch, Hawkeye (replacing U.S. Agent from the comics) and Spider Woman.

The season consisted mostly of single-episode open-and-shut-case adventures, with two two-part stories late towards the end. Unlike many other Marvel animated series, despite featuring over-the-top titles that paid homage to the early Stan Lee written Marvel comics of the 1960s (for example, "The Grim Reaper Wears a Teflon Coat", and "Rejoice, I am Ultimo, Thy Deliverer"), almost none of the episodes were adaptations of comic book stories, consisting instead of original stories penned by Ron Friedman, occasionally collaborated on by Stan Lee himself. The closest the season came to adapting a comic book tale was in the two-part "The Origin of Iron Man", which recounted a (modified and modernized) version of the character's comic book origin (see below) just before the season concluded.

This late-run recounting of the title character's origin is symptomatic of what is generally thought of as the season's greatest weakness – despite (or perhaps because of) having such a large cast of characters, very few of the show's heroes and villains were actually developed in any way, leaving viewers unaware of their personal stories and powers. The show is generally held to have been at its best when filling in these origin blanks (MODOK in "Enemy Without, Enemy Within," Iron Man and the Mandarin in their self-titled "The Origin of..." episodes), but these were rare occasions, with virtually every other plot simply consisting of the Mandarin attempting to steal Stark's newest invention and being bested, often through very strange and illogical means (with the nadir perhaps being Iron Man somehow using the energy of a small tape-player to restore his armor to full power in "Silence My Companion, Death My Destination").

A small sub-plot in the first season revolves around Mandarin secretly spying on Force Works. It culminates in "The Wedding of Iron Man" when Stark realizes they have been spied on by reviewing events from previous episodes (and explaining how Mandarin's forces always knew where they would be), realizing that Mandarin has acquired enough information to potentially deduce the true identity of Iron Man. The entire episode's plot is dedicated to resolving the problem, culminating in Iron Man and his team setting up an elaborate deception where Mandarin sees Iron Man and Tony Stark in the same place with the intention being to convince him that the two men are not the same person (the 'Tony' in this situation was an android).

In this first season the subtle keyboard's main theme is created by the legendary progressive rock artist Keith Emerson, most know today for his work on the supergroup Emerson, Lake & Palmer and for his soundtrack for Dario Argento's horror Inferno.

Second season
In 1995, Marvel switched The Marvel Action Hour to a new animation studio (as previously mentioned, the animation in season 1 was provided by the Rainbow Animation Group, while the animation in season 2 was provided by Koko Enterprises), and with it came new writers (Ron Friedman was replaced by Tom Tataranowicz for season 2) and new music for each sequence, coupled with a new direction for the series. The first season's theme song was replaced in the second season by an intense electric guitar theme (composed by William Kevin Anderson), featuring the repeated refrain of "I am Iron Man!", while showing Tony Stark beating red-hot iron plates into shape with a blacksmith's hammer (possibly to mimic the Black Sabbath song "Iron Man"). Tony Stark's longer hair style in the second season was based upon the artist Mark Bright's depiction of Stark from the late 1980s, which is where most of the episodes from season 2 were based upon. In the first season, the series seemed to follow the look of an early 1990s Marvel comic (specifically, artist Paul Ryan's take on Iron Man).

One major change was that, like in the comics, Tony Stark's worsening medical condition (brought upon by a missile striking him in the season premiere causing severe damage to his already ill body) required him to need periodic recharges of his "body battery" (represented as a piece of cybernetic tech over his right pectoral muscle) to keep him alive, akin to how in the comics Tony needed his armor's chest plate to keep him alive (though unlike in the comics he did not need to wear the chest plate at all times). Another major change was that Tony could literally change armors on the fly, represented as vocalizing the name of the specific armor, which would then appear in place of his usual suit in a ring of energy (and would similarly revert to his usual armor as necessary); in addition to the hydro, stealth and space armors, as seen in the comics, several new armors were invented for the second season (and in turn for the toy line), specifically magnetic (able to give off electro-magnetic charges), radiation (used for situations involving contaminated areas), inferno (fire-fighting), subterranean (for drilling underground) and samurai (never actually used in combat). However, prolonged use of his specialized armors would often leave Tony's power levels low and endangering his life.

The new story lines spanned multiple episodes and were no longer "open and shut" cases. They formed a linking narrative, featuring themes of duplicity, consequence, and phobias. Also, the stories were no longer centered on the Mandarin, whose rings had been scattered and whose power had been depleted. While the Mandarin did appear in these episodes, his appearances were reduced to cameos in the cliffhangers at the end of the story, as he tried to retrieve each ring.

Another change was that Force Works was mostly written out of the series, parting ways with Stark after he deceives them in order to work in secret with the Mandarin when Fin Fang Foom and his fellow Dragons were plotting to eliminate Earth. When Stark's counter plan against Justin Hammer, which includes faking his death without the knowledge of his teammates, leads to a disbanding of Force Works, Julia Carpenter and James Rhodes are the only ones who continue to work with Stark. This split would be revisited with Stark's ensuing conflicts with Hawkeye over the course of several episodes.

Also, War Machine develops a phobia of being trapped inside his armor (also based on a then-current comic storyline), but this is resolved before the final episode. While Rhodes was active as War Machine in season 1, he remained out of armor for the majority of season 2 due to reliving a tragic drowning experience while being trapped underwater in the War Machine armor in the season 2 episode "Fire and Rain". Rhodes eventually overcomes his fear and dons the War Machine armor once again in the episode "Distant Boundaries".

Prior to finding his last two rings, the Mandarin claims his eighth ring from MODOK in the episode "Empowered". "Empowered" was the clip show of the season, the purpose being that the Mandarin wanted to learn of Iron Man's recent activities. In the finale, the Mandarin, having regained all of his rings, unleashes a mist using the Heart of Darkness to render everything technological useless. Iron Man reunites with Force Works in order to stop him. The Mandarin unmasks Iron Man before their final showdown ends in his death. More specifically, Iron Man manages to reflect the power of Mandarin's rings, destroying them, and ultimately leaving the Mandarin with amnesia and helpless before a band of mountain bandits who likely killed him. After the death of the Mandarin, MODOK and the rest of Mandarin's henchmen were sent to jail.

After disappointing ratings, the series was canceled.

The Incredible Hulk (1996 TV series) and Spider-Man (1994 TV series) crossovers

Dorian Harewood reprises his role of War Machine from the solo Iron Man animated series in the episode "Helping Hand, Iron Fist". He originally stops Rick Jones from seeing Tony Stark (voiced by Robert Hays, who was also reprising his Iron Man role) at Stark Enterprises, but takes him to Stark after Jones explained that he needed Stark's help to find Bruce Banner. He later alerts Stark of the arrival of General Ross, S.H.I.E.L.D. agent Gabriel Jones, and a squad of Hulkbusters. War Machine fights some of the Hulkbusters alongside Jones and Iron Man.

The pair appear again in 1994's Spider-Man The Animated Series. Iron Man was once again voiced by Robert Hays and a different version of War Machine was voiced by James Avery (reprising their parts from the Iron Man animated series around the same period at the time when Dorian Harewood was voicing Tombstone) on Spider-Man: The Animated Series. They first appeared in the episodes "Venom Returns" and "Carnage" in which Dormammu orders Venom to steal the Time Dilation Accelerator from Stark Enterprises, which is capable of releasing Dormammu from his own far-off dimension. Venom is quickly defeated by Spider-Man and War Machine. However, Venom gets help from Cletus Kasady, his cellmate who has bonded with another symbiote, Carnage. After the Symbiotes steal the machine, War Machine is too wounded to continue fighting, so Iron Man teams up with Spider-Man and stops the Symbiotes and prevent Dormammu from leaving his dimension. Iron Man also makes a cameo in the episode called "The Spot, in which Tony Stark fires Dr. Jonathon Ohn from the Time Dilation Accelerator project because Stark knows the project is dangerous after Carnage almost released Dormammu to Earth using Accelerator machinery. Iron Man later appears in the three-part episode Secret Wars in which the Beyonder creates a war between good and evil to see who is better. In the end, the heroes win and everyone, except for Spider-Man who has to stop the evil Spider-Carnage from destroying all of reality in the following series finale, is sent back to Earth without any memory.

Cast

Main
 Robert Hays – Iron Man/Tony Stark, Living Laser
 James Avery – War Machine/James Rhodes (Season 1, episodes 1–5), Whirlwind (Season 1, episodes 1–10), Blacklash (1994–1995)
 Ed Gilbert – Mandarin (Season 1), Grey Gargoyle, Ultimo
 Robert Ito – Mandarin (Season 2)
 Jim Cummings – MODOK, Century ("The Beast Within" only), many additional supporting characters (including Bill Clinton) and stand-in vocals for War Machine, Whirlwind, Grey Gargoyle, & Justin Hammer
 Dorian Harewood – War Machine/James Rhodes (Season 1, episode 6 onwards), Whirlwind (Season 1, episode 11 onwards), Blacklash (1995–1996), Stilt-Man
 John Reilly – Hawkeye/Clint Barton, Beetle
 Katherine Moffat – Scarlet Witch/Wanda Frank (Season 1), Rachel Carpenter
 Linda Holdahl – Hypnotia (Season 1)
 Jennifer Darling – Scarlet Witch (Season 2), Hypnotia (Season 2)
 Casey Defranco – Spider-Woman/Julia Carpenter (Season 1)
 Jennifer Hale – Spider-Woman/Julia Carpenter (Season 2), Ghost (shared)
 James Warwick – Century (Season 1), Sam Jaggers, General Hirsch
 Tom Kane – H.O.M.E.R., Century ("Hands of the Mandarin" only), Stingray, Ghost (shared), Sunturion

Recurring
 Philip Abbott – Nick Fury
 Neil Dickson – Dreadknight
 Linda Holdahl – Hypnotia (Season 1)
 Chuck McCann – Blizzard
 Neil Ross – Fin Fang Foom, Wellington Yinsen, Howard Walter Stark (Season 1), Blizzard ("The Beast Within" only)
 Tony Steedman – Justin Hammer (Season 1)
 Efrem Zimbalist Jr. – Justin Hammer (Season 2), Firepower

Guests
 Dimitra Aryls – Martha Stark
 Sarah Douglas – Alana Ulanova
 Jeannie Elias – Veronica Benning
 Matt Frewer – Leader
 William Hootkins – Crimson Dynamo (1st time)
 Jamie Horton – Controller, Ghost (shared)
 Julia Kato – Dr. Su-Yin
 Todd Louiso – The Hacker
 Gerard Maguire – Titanium Man
 Neal McDonough – Firebrand/Gary Gilbert
 Ron Perlman – Hulk/Bruce Banner
 Peter Renaday – Howard Stark (Season 2)
 Stu Rosen – Crimson Dynamo (2nd time)
 Marla Rubinoff – Elastika
 W. Morgan Sheppard – Dum Dum Dugan
 Scott Valentine – Dark Aegis
 David Warner – Arthur Dearborn
 Lisa Zane – Madame Masque

Home media
On October 8, 2007, both seasons were released together in a Region 2 three-disc set from Jetix Europe and Maximum Entertainment Ltd. in 2007, when Disney had the rights to the Marvel shows and before they brought the rights back, all before the 2009 take over of Marvel by Disney. The 3 disc set had no features and just included all 26 episodes. UK company Clear Vision Ltd. released two sets exclusive to their website on April 19, 2010. One contains all 26 episodes over 4 discs while the other – which includes the 1960s Iron Man animated series – is a six disc box set entitled Iron Man: The Ultimate Collection. Buena Vista Home Entertainment released the entire series on Region 4 DVD – which spans 3 separate volumes – on March 30, 2010 and later released the series on Region 1 DVD on May 4, 2010 to coincide with Iron Man 2, which opened in theaters a few days later, on May 7. The series is available to stream on Disney+, as of the service's launch on November 12, 2019.

Comics
An eight-issue comic-book series based on the show was published by Marvel:
 Marvel Action Hour: Iron Man (November 1994 to June 1995).

References

External links
 
 
 DRG4's Iron Man: The Animated Series page
 Marvel Animation Age – Iron Man 
 The History of Iron Man on TV
 TVShowsonDVD.com
 The Marvel Action Hour (1994–1996) | Iron Man TV | Iron Man World | UGO.com

1990s American animated television series
1994 American television series debuts
1996 American television series endings
American children's animated action television series
American children's animated adventure television series
American children's animated science fantasy television series
American children's animated superhero television series
Animated television series based on Marvel Comics
Animated series produced by Marvel Studios
First-run syndicated television programs in the United States
Iron Man television series
Television series by Saban Entertainment
Television shows set in Los Angeles
Works by Len Wein